Lidzava is a village in the Gagra District of Abkhazia, Georgia.

See also
 Gagra District

Notes

References

Gagra District Administration

Other

Populated places in Gagra District
Sukhum Okrug